Lipovăț is a commune in Vaslui County, Western Moldavia, Romania. It is composed of five villages: Căpușneni, Chițoc, Corbu, Fundu Văii and Lipovăț.

Notable residents include actor Ștefan Ciubotărașu (1910 - 1970) and Dumitru Nagîț (1949 - 2003), mayor of Iași.

References

Communes in Vaslui County
Localities in Western Moldavia